Gabriel Grégoire was a defensive lineman in the Canadian Football League.

Grégoire went to high school at the Collège de Montréal, but played his junior football with the Verdun Maple Leafs.

The  and  lineman joined the Montreal Alouettes in 1976 and played 5 seasons, for a total of 65 games, and three Grey Cup championships, one, the 65th Grey Cup, which he helped win in 1977.
	
Gabriel Grégoire was always a fan favourite in predominantly francophone Montreal, as he was truly a home grown talent playing during the Alouettes' glory years.

Grégoire was the co-host of the sport radio show on CKAC sport named Sports du lit with host Michel Langevin.  He also appears regularly on television for his football and sports expertise.

References

1953 births
Living people
Montreal Alouettes players
Players of Canadian football from Quebec
Canadian Football League announcers
Collège de Montréal alumni